Flak was introduced to the English language in World War II to refer to the anti-aircraft fire from anti-aircraft guns, from the German Flugabwehrkanone (Flak), for "aircraft defence cannon".

Flak may also refer to:

Warfare 

 Flak tower, a defensive structure

Arts, entertainment, and media

Fictional entities
 Flak, a fictional commanding officer in the video game Advance Wars 2: Black Hole Rising
 F.L.A.K., a fictional weapon in the G.I. Joe universe
 FL4K, a fictional wandering robot in the video game Borderlands 3

Other uses in arts, entertainment, and media
 Flak (video game), an 8-bit computer game published in 1984 by Funsoft
 Flak, a UK band whose music has featured in Malcolm in the Middle
 Flak Magazine, an American online magazine, founded in 1998

Other uses
 Flak, intense criticism, a metaphor derived from intense anti-aircraft gunfire
 "Flak", a class of the Propaganda model advanced by Edward S. Herman and Noam Chomsky
 Flak, "flat land" or "flat sandbank", a component of Germanic language area place names, e.g. Flakfortet
 Flak jacket, protective clothing worn by soldiers and others to protect themselves from debris and shrapnel

See also 
 FLAC (Free Lossless Audio Codec), an audio data compression scheme
 Flak or Flack, an informal term for a media relations representative
 Flack (disambiguation)